Batutara stratovolcano is a volcano located on the small isolated Komba Island in the Flores Sea in Indonesia. Vegetations covers the flanks of Batu Tara. The first historical eruption occurred in 1852 with explosions and lava flows.

See also 

 List of volcanoes in Indonesia

References 

B
B
B
B
Lesser Sunda Islands
Holocene stratovolcanoes